Aydınlar  (formerly Avgadı) is a village in Erdemli district of Mersin Province, Turkey. At  it is  situated in Taurus Mountains. There are cedar and turpentine  forests around the village and the former name of the village may refer to game animals ("av" in Turkish means hunt). The major economic activity is agriculture. Apple, cherry and cereals are produced. Animal breeding is another activity.

References

Villages in Erdemli District